Stonehaven is a town in Aberdeenshire, Scotland.

Stonehaven may also refer to
Places
Stonehaven, Victoria, Australia
Stonehaven, New Brunswick, Canada
Stonehaven is a community in Newmarket, Ontario
Stonehaven (Charlotte neighborhood), North Carolina, United States
Stonehaven, Wisconsin, United States
People
Viscount Stonehaven, a title in the peerage of the United Kingdom
Other
Stonehaven (comics), graphic novels set in the fictional city of Stonehaven
Stonehaven derailment, a railway accident in Scotland
Stonehaven Group, a geologic formation
Stonehaven (Media, Pennsylvania), a historic house in the United States